"La Bamba" is a Mexican folk song, originally from the state of Veracruz, also known as "La Bomba". The song is best known from a 1958 adaptation by Ritchie Valens, a Top 40 hit in the U.S. charts. Valens's version is ranked number 345 on Rolling Stone magazine′s list of the 500 Greatest Songs of All Time.

"La Bamba" has been covered by numerous artists, notably by Los Lobos whose version was the title track of the 1987 film La Bamba, a bio-pic about Valens; their version reached No. 1 in many charts in the same year. The Belgian Electronic band "Telex", the trio who made the worldwide successful "Moskow Diskow," also created a downbeat electronic cover of it, which is the final track in their final album "How Do You Dance?".

Traditional versions
"La Bamba" is a classic example of the son jarocho musical style, which originated in the Mexican state of Veracruz, and combines Spanish, indigenous, and African musical elements. The song is typically played on one or two arpa jarochas (harps) along with guitar relatives the jarana jarocha and the requinto jarocho. Lyrics to the song vary greatly, as performers often improvise verses while performing. However, versions such as those by musical groups Mariachi Vargas de Tecalitlan and Los Pregoneros del Puerto have survived because of the artists' popularity. The traditional aspect of "La Bamba" lies in the tune, which remains almost the same through most versions. The name of the dance referenced within the song, which has no direct English translation, is presumably connected with the Spanish verb "bambolear", meaning "to sway", "to shake" or "to wobble". In one traditional version of this dance performed at weddings and ballet folklórico shows, couples utilize intricate footwork to create a bow signifying their union.

Early recordings
"La Bamba" has its origin in the state of Veracruz, Mexico. The oldest recorded version known is that of Alvaro Hernández Ortiz, who recorded the song with the name of "El Jarocho". His recording was released by Victor Records in Mexico in 1938 or 1939, and was reissued on a 1997 compilation by Yazoo Records, The Secret Museum of Mankind Vol. 4.

According to a 1945 article in Life, the song and associated dance were brought "out of the jungle" at Veracruz by American bandleader Everett Hoagland, who introduced it at Ciro's nightclub in Mexico City. It became popular, and the song was adopted by Mexican presidential candidate Miguel Alemán Valdés who used it in his successful campaign. Later in 1945, the music and dance were introduced at the Stork Club in New York City by Arthur Murray. A popular version by Andrés Huesca (1917–1957) and his brother Victor, billed as Hermanos Huesca, was issued on Peerless Records in Mexico around 1945–46. Huesca re-recorded the song for RCA Victor in 1947, and the same year the song featured as a production number in the MGM musical film Fiesta, performed by a group called Los Bocheros. The song was featured in the 1946 Mexican movie Rayando el Sol starring Pedro Armendáriz.

The Swedish-American folk singer William Clauson recorded the song in several languages in the early and mid-1950s. He claimed to have heard the song in Veracruz, and in performance slowed down the tempo to encourage audience participation. Another version, "somewhat bowdlerized", was recorded by Cynthia Gooding on her 1953 Elektra album, Mexican Folk Songs.

Ritchie Valens version

Ritchie Valens learned the song in his youth, from his cousin Dickie Cota. In 1958 he recorded a rock and roll flavored version of "La Bamba", together with session musicians Buddy Clark (string bass); Ernie Freeman (piano); Carol Kaye (acoustic rhythm guitar); René Hall (Danelectro six-string baritone guitar); and Earl Palmer (drums and claves). It was originally released as the B-side of "Donna", on the Del-Fi label.

The song features a simple verse-chorus form. Valens, who was proud of his Mexican heritage, was hesitant at first to merge "La Bamba" with rock and roll, but then agreed. The song ranked No. 98 in VH1's 100 Greatest Songs of Rock and Roll in 1999, and No. 59 in VH1's 100 Greatest Dance Songs in 2000. Furthermore, Valens' recording of the song was inducted into the Latin Grammy Hall of Fame.

The song was listed at number 354 in the 500 Greatest Songs of All Time by Rolling Stone magazine, being the only non-English language song included in the list. It was also included in Robert Christgau's "Basic Record Library" of 1950s and 1960s recordings published in Christgau's Record Guide: Rock Albums of the Seventies (1981).  Valens was inducted posthumously into the Rock and Roll Hall of Fame in 2001.   In 2018, Valens' version was selected by the Library of Congress for preservation in the National Recording Registry for being "culturally, historically, or aesthetically significant". It is also included in the Rock and Roll Hall of Fame's list of 500 songs that were influential in shaping rock and roll.

Charts

Los Lobos version

The music video directed by Sherman Halsey won the 1988 MTV Video Music Award for Best Video from a Film; it also featured Lou Diamond Phillips, the actor who played Valens in the 1987 film of the same name. The song was also the fourth wholly non-English language song to top the Billboard Hot 100. The song was later featured in the game Guitar Hero World Tour.

Charts

Weekly charts

Year-end charts

All-time charts

Certifications and sales

Other notable versions
In 1960, Harry Belafonte's live version of the song was released on his album Belafonte Returns to Carnegie Hall. His previously recorded but unreleased studio version from 1958 was included in a 2001 compilation, Very Best of Harry Belafonte, under the title "Bam Bam Bamba".
In 1965, Dusty Springfield covered the song for her second album, Ev'rything's Coming Up Dusty. It was also included on You Don't Have To Say You Love Me in 1966, which was more or less an American re-issue of the previous album.
In 1985, Canadian children's singer Charlotte Diamond released a cover of the song on her Juno Award-winning debut album 10 Carrot Diamond. The cover is perhaps best known for appearing in the children's television series Ants in Your Pants.
A song from a Bosnian pop-rock band Crvena jabuka "Sviđa mi se ova stvar" released in 1988, is heavily influenced by "La Bamba".
Texas rock band Los Lonely Boys have frequently performed "La Bamba" in concert. They cite Valens as an influence in their music.
A Star Academy 3 version of "La Bamba" reached No. 3 in France on December 13, 2003, In January 2004, it reached No. 5 in Wallonia, Belgium.
Wyclef Jean and Dora the Explorer in the 2010 Mega Music Fest on Nickelodeon.

See also
 Bambera
 La Bamba, a 1987 film
 La Bamba, soundtrack from film homonymous

References

1958 singles
1987 singles
2003 singles
Ritchie Valens songs
Los Lobos songs
Star Academy France songs
Billboard Hot 100 number-one singles
Cashbox number-one singles
Number-one singles in Australia
Number-one singles in Belgium
Number-one singles in Finland
SNEP Top Singles number-one singles
Number-one singles in Italy
Number-one singles in New Zealand
Number-one singles in Switzerland
Number-one singles in Spain
Number-one singles in Zimbabwe
UK Singles Chart number-one singles
RPM Top Singles number-one singles
Grammy Hall of Fame Award recipients
Latin Grammy Hall of Fame Award recipients
Music videos directed by Sherman Halsey
Songs from Grease (film)
Spanish-language songs
Year of song unknown
Warner Records singles
United States National Recording Registry recordings